National Highway 143D, commonly referred to as the NH 143D is a national highway in India. It is a secondary route of National Highway 43.  NH-143D runs in the state of Jharkhand in India.

Route 
NH143D connects Jamtoli, Basia, Kamadara, Torpa and Khunti in the state of Jharkhand.

Junctions  

  Terminal near Jamtoli.
  Terminal near Khunti.

See also 
 List of National Highways in India
 List of National Highways in India by state

References

External links 

 NH 143D on OpenStreetMap

National highways in India
National Highways in Jharkhand